The men's individual time trial event was part of the road cycling programme at the 1920 Summer Olympics.  The results of individual cyclists were summed to give team results in the team time trial event.

Results

References

Notes
 
 

Men's time trial individual
Road cycling at the 1920 Summer Olympics
Cycling at the Summer Olympics – Men's individual time trial